I Got Life! is a 2017 French drama film directed by Blandine Lenoir.

Plot 
Aurore is fifty years old, separated from her husband, Nanar, and with two grown up daughters. The restaurant she works at is under new management from an insufferable boss, and she is suffering with symptoms of the menopause. While pretending to view an apartment that her friend Marie-Noelle (known as Mano) is selling, she reencounters an old flame and her former husband’s best friend, Christophe, with whom she reconnects.

Her eldest daughter, Marina, tells her that she is pregnant. Aurore at first is worried that Marina is making a similar mistake to her in having a baby so young, which upsets Marina. Aurore arranges for Marina to have her initial scans at the hospital where Christophe works in order to see him again, although this leads to a further argument and reconciliation. Christophe and Aurore meet for a few dates. Infuriated by the changes to the restaurant, Aurore quits her job as a waitress.

Aurore’s younger daughter, Lucie, announces that she is leaving for Barcelona with her boyfriend, who is moving there for work. Nanar tells Aurore that he wants a divorce so he can marry his new partner, with whom he now has two young daughters. Aurore stops seeing Christophe, and starts seeing Hervé, whom she met at a party hosted by Mano. After some time at the job centre, Aurore finds a job as a cleaner for a group of four retired women.

At a high school reunion, an old classmate assumes that Aurore and Christophe are a long-term couple, and cannot believe that Aurore instead married Nanar. Marina comes to stay with Aurore, and Lucie returns from Barcelona after breaking up with her boyfriend.

Hervé invites Aurore for a romantic getaway to Venice, but she is hesitant to accept, holding on to her feelings for Christophe. Just as she is driving away, she spots Christophe heading towards her house, getting out of the car. They reunite, and Marina gives birth to Aurore’s first grandchild.

Cast 
 Agnès Jaoui: Aurore Tabort
 Thibault de Montalembert: Christophe Tochard
 Pascale Arbillot: Mano
 Sarah Suco: Marina Tabort
 Lou Roy-Lecollinet: Lucie Tabort
 Philippe Rebbot: Nanar
 Samir Guesmi: The trainer
 Laure Calamy: The Pôle Emploi employee

References

External links

2017 films
French drama films
2010s French-language films
2017 drama films
2010s French films